Antonio Cardenal Caldera (15 June 1950 – 11 April 1991), also known by the nom de guerre Jesus Rojas (Red Jesus), was a Nicaraguan and a major leader of the FMLN (Farabundo Martí National Liberation Front) resistance movement in late-20th century El Salvador.

Early life
Born in Nicaragua to a prominent family, Cardenal was one of the ten children of Julio Cardenal and Indiana Caldera. His father's cousins included Ernesto Cardenal and his brother Fernando, both priests who adhered to liberation theology. Cardenal decided to pursue a career in the Jesuit seminary. After being  sent to El Salvador as a priest, Cardenal was profoundly impacted by the anti-Jesuit violence he witnessed perpetrated by the Salvadoran government. Due to these events, he went underground as a rebel leader of the FMLN movement, in which he led the FPL (Fuerzas Populares de Liberación) for several years. He was a major proponent of the peace talks with the government in the early 1990s, and worked towards a negotiated peace for both sides. On April 11, 1991, Cardenal was assassinated by a group of Army troops attempting to sabotage the peace process. However, the FMLN leadership decided to proceed with the talks at the expense of one of their commanders.

References

1950 births
1991 deaths
Nicaraguan Jesuits
Assassinated Nicaraguan people
Assassinated religious leaders
People murdered in Nicaragua
People of the Salvadoran Civil War
1991 crimes in Nicaragua
1991 murders in North America
1990s murders in Nicaragua
20th-century Roman Catholic priests

This man was an FMLN guerrilla commander in charge of fighting troops who died during an army ambush in a combat zone,he wasn’t an innocent peace seeker and totally false that those Salvadoran Army troops were trying to sabotage any peace process